CBS 44 may refer to one of the following television stations in the United States:
 WEVV-TV in Evansville, Indiana
 WSWG in Valdosta, Georgia